Ojrzanów may refer to:

Ojrzanów, Łódź Voivodeship, Poland
Ojrzanów, Masovian Voivodeship, Poland